Drasteria philippina is a moth of the family Erebidae. It is found on the Canary Islands, as well as in Morocco, Algeria, Libya, Egypt, Israel and Malta.

References

Drasteria
Moths described in 1800
Moths of Africa
Moths of the Middle East